Swete is a surname. Notable people with the surname include:

Henry Barclay Swete (1835–1917), English Biblical scholar and professor of divinity
John Swete (1752–1821), English clergyman, artist, antiquary, and topographer

See also
Sweet (disambiguation)
Swetes